Jamal Arago (born 28 August 1993) is a professional footballer who plays as a left back. Born in Ghana, he plays for the Liberia national team.

Career
In 2009, Arago won the reality show MTN Soccer Academy. After that, he joined the youth academy of Dutch side FC Twente.

He then signed for Atromitos in the Greek top flight.

Before the second half of 2015–16, Arago signed for Kosovan club Gjilani. In 2016, he signed for AC Kajaani in Finland.

In 2021, he signed for Azerbaijani team Sabail. On 14 August 2021, Arago debuted for Sabail during a 1–0 win over Sabah (Azerbaijan).

On 26 July 2022, Arago joined Saudi Arabian club Ohod.

International career
Born in Ghana, Arago is of Liberian descent through a grandmother. He debuted for the Liberia national team in a 2–0 2022 FIFA World Cup qualification loss to Nigeria on 13 November 2021.

References

External links
 
 Jamal Arago at playmakerstats.com

1993 births
Living people
Footballers from Accra
Liberian footballers
Liberia international footballers
Liberian expatriate footballers
Liberian expatriate sportspeople in the Netherlands
Liberian expatriate sportspeople in Greece
Liberian expatriates in Finland
Liberian expatriate sportspeople in Kosovo
Liberian expatriate sportspeople in Azerbaijan
Liberian expatriate sportspeople in Saudi Arabia
Expatriate footballers in Saudi Arabia
Liberian people of Ghanaian descent

People with acquired Liberian citizenship
Ghanaian footballers
Ghanaian expatriate footballers
Ghanaian expatriate sportspeople in the Netherlands
Ghanaian expatriate sportspeople in Greece
Ghanaian expatriate sportspeople in Finland
Ghanaian expatriate sportspeople in Kosovo
Ghanaian expatriate sportspeople in Azerbaijan
Ghanaian people of Liberian descent
Sportspeople of Liberian descent
Association football fullbacks
Berekum Chelsea F.C. players
FC Twente players
Super League Greece players
Atromitos F.C. players
Football Superleague of Kosovo players
SC Gjilani players
FC Prishtina players
FC Drita players
Kakkonen players
AC Kajaani players
Azerbaijan Premier League players
Sabail FK players
Saudi First Division League players
Ohod Club players